Dichomeris albula is a moth of the family Gelechiidae. It was described by Kyu-Tek Park and Ronald W. Hodges in 1995. It is indigenous to Taiwan.

The length of the forewings is 7-7.5 mm. The forewings are pale greyish brown, edged with brown on the anterior margin and with a large, dark brown round stigma near the middle and another smaller one at the end of the cell, another one beneath the first large one on the fold. The postmedian line is yellowish white, followed by a brown fascia which extends to the margin. There are dark brown scales around the apex and along the termen. The hindwings are grey.

References

albula
Moths described in 1995
Moths of Taiwan